Chionodes frigidella is a moth in the family Gelechiidae. It is found in the Palearctic realm.

References

Chionodes
Moths described in 1995
Palearctic Lepidoptera